Emma Ruth Talley (born March 23, 1994) is an American professional golfer who plays on the LPGA Tour. While playing as an amateur at the University of Alabama, she won the 2013 U.S. Women's Amateur by defeating Yueer Cindy Feng in the 36-hole final match, 2 & 1.

Early life
Talley was born in Paducah, Kentucky on March 23, 1994. Her parents are Dan and Jennifer Talley. She has an older sister, Leigh Anne, and two brothers, Joe Dan and Jackson. She grew up in Princeton, Kentucky and graduated from Caldwell County High School, where she was a three-time (2008, 2010, 2011) Kentucky state girls golf champion.

College
Talley played golf four years at the University of Alabama. In 2015, she won the NCAA Division I Women's Championship at The Concession Golf Club in Bradenton, Florida, by one stroke (3-under-par 285) over Gaby López of Arkansas and Leona Maguire of Duke. As a junior, she was named the winner of the Honda Sports Award for golf.

Talley was a four-time Women's Golf Coaches Association All-America selection, earning First Team honors as a junior in 2015 and as senior in 2016 after earning Second Team honors in 2013 and Honorable Mention in 2014. She also picked up Second Team All-America honors from Golfweek in 2016.

She was First Team All-SEC in 2016 after earning All-SEC Second Team honors the previous three years.

Amateur
In 2008, Talley was on the victorious U.S. Junior Ryder Cup team, which defeated Europe 22–2. On August 11, 2013, Talley won the U.S. Women's Amateur in a 36-hole finale by defeating Yueer Cindy Feng, 2 & 1. She competed in all the LPGA majors except The Evian Championship in 2014. Her best finish was at the Ricoh Women's British Open with a total score of six-over-par, receiving the low amateur honors.

Professional career
Talley joined the Symetra Tour in 2016. That season saw her compete in 14 tournaments, finishing in the top-10 in three events, including a runner-up finish in the Fuccillo Kia Championship on June 3, where she earned a season-high $12,021. She also tied for second at the Kansas City Championship and tied for fourth at the Tullymore Classic.

In 2018, Talley began her rookie year on the LPGA Tour and already has two top-10 finishes on her resume: seventh at the Women's Australian Open and fifth at the Hugel-JTBC LA Open. She is 44th on the money list with earnings approaching $120,000 in eight events.

Professional wins

Symetra Tour wins
2017 Island Resort Championship

Playoff record
LPGA Tour playoff record (0–1)

U.S. national team appearances
Amateur
Junior Ryder Cup: 2010 (winners)
Junior Solheim Cup: 2011 (tie, Cup retained)
Curtis Cup: 2014 (winners)
Espirito Santo Trophy: 2014

References

External links

American female golfers
Alabama Crimson Tide women's golfers
Winners of ladies' major amateur golf championships
Golfers from Kentucky
Sportswomen from Kentucky
Sportspeople from Paducah, Kentucky
People from Princeton, Kentucky
1994 births
Living people
20th-century American women
21st-century American women